Solar Plexus is a compilation album released by Mavin Records on May 8, 2012. Produced entirely by Don Jazzy, the album comprises 13 tracks and was made available for free digital download. It contains solo tracks from D'Prince, Tiwa Savage, Wande Coal and Dr SID. The album's release coincided with the record label's launch date. Solar Plexus was supported by two singles: "Take Banana" and "Omo Ga". It received generally negative reviews from music critics.

Background and singles 
The album's recording sessions took place in Lagos at Mavin Records Studio. Solar Plexus was mixed and mastered by James "LeRock" Loughrey at Tardis Studios in the United Kingdom. Fans hoped for reconciliation between Don Jazzy and D'banj, but weren't certain on the future of Mo' Hits Records. In the midst of this, Don Jazzy announced the establishment of Mavin Records on Twitter. He sought support from his fans, saying, "Please open up your hearts, lend us your ears, give us your love and support as always and let’s continue to entertain you". With the launch of the new label, it was further revealed that the album would be made available the next day.

"Take Banana" was released as the album's lead single. D'Prince remixed the song for his debut studio album Frenzy (2012). "Omo Ga" was released as the album's second single; a teaser of the music video was released.

Critical reception

Solar Plexus received negative reviews from music critics. A writer for Nigerian Sounds granted the album 6.8 stars out of 10, applauding Don Jazzy for producing the entire album in three days. Amb Noni of TayoTV awarded the album 6 stars out of 10, saying it was "rushed". James Silas of Hip Hop World Magazine gave the album 2 stars out of 5, saying the "haste to put out an album to officially unveil Mavin Records sort of affected the total composition of the project." Ogaga Sakapide of TooXclusive also assigned 2 stars out of 5, saying it "gives the impression of a hurriedly packaged work with so-so lyrics, ill-matched materials and several hit-miss moments." Wilfred Okiche, whose review was posted on 360nobs, described the record as a "vanity project for Don Jazzy to prove he's still got it after all that happened and unfortunately everyone else is relegated to second place". Chi Ibe of YNaija said the album was "a mistake". Ayomide Tayo of Nigerian Entertainment Today assigned a score of 2 out of 5 and opined that Solar Plexus is Don Jazzy's weakest produced album of his career."

Track listing

Personnel

Michael Collins Ajereh – executive producer, creative director, writer, producer
Tiwatope Savage – primary artist, writer
Sidney Onoriode Esiri – primary artist, writer
Oluwatobi Wande Ojosipe – primary artist, writer 
Charles Enebeli – primary artist, writer
Towa Ojosipe – writer
 James "Lerock" Loughrey – mixing engineer

Release History

References

2012 compilation albums
Albums produced by Don Jazzy
Tiwa Savage albums
Dr SID albums
Don Jazzy albums